Double dip or double dipping may refer to:

Food 
 , biting a chip and then re-dipping it into a dip
 Double Dip (confectionery), flavored powders with an edible stick to dip into them
 Originally it means taking twice the portion of everyone else from a common food source; as dipping the ladle in twice into soup, stew, porridge etc. when others are doled out one ladleful.

Economics 
 Double-dipping, the practice of releasing multiple special editions of a media product to consumers or of being illegitimately compensated a second time for the same activity
 Double-dip recession, a recession shape used by economists

Other 
 Double Dip, a "lifeline" in the Who Wants to Be a Millionaire? franchise
 Double dip (roller coaster element), a downward portion of a "hill" which is divided into two separate drops 
 Double dipping, metaphor for circular analysis in statistics
 Double dipping (in US political commentary) or dual mandate, an elected official holding more than one elected or public position concurrently
 Double dipping, a hybrid open-access model used by journals to receive payments for guaranteeing open access of an article while also charging readers for accessing it

See also 
 "Second Bite of the Apple"
 Three Bites of the Apple